TRNA (pseudouridine54-N1)-methyltransferase (TrmY, m1Psi methyltransferase) is an enzyme with systematic name S-adenosyl-L-methionine:tRNA (pseudouridine54-N1)-methyltransferase. This enzyme catalyses the following chemical reaction

 S-adenosyl-L-methionine + pseudouridine54 in tRNA  S-adenosyl-L-homocysteine + N1-methylpseudouridine54 in tRNA

This archaeal enzyme is specific for the 54 position.

References

External links 
 

EC 2.1.1